Aviary was a restaurant on Alberta Street in northeast Portland, Oregon's Vernon neighborhood, in the United States. Sarah Pliner was a co-owner and head chef.

Description 
Aviary operated on Alberta Street in northeast Portland's Vernon neighborhood. The New American and French bistro had an Asian influence and focused on small plates. According to Oregon Public Broadcasting, the restaurant "mixed French technique with East Asian elements". Menu options included a Banh Mi burger, duck liver toasts, lobster rolls, octopus, pig ears, beer and cocktails. Eater Portland described Aviary as "chic".

History 
Sarah Pliner, Kat Whitehead, and Jasper Shen opened the restaurant in 2011. In July, a fire forced the business to close temporarily for five months. Aviary re-opened on December 6.

Molly Harbarger included Aviary in The Oregonian's 2016 list of Portland's most expensive restaurants.

The restaurant closed in 2020, during the COVID-19 pandemic, and was replaced by Gumba.

Reception 
In 2012, Aviary was named Restaurant of the Year by Willamette Week. Fodor's said, "Eschewing many culinary conventions, this visionary Alberta Street eatery serves up innovative dishes that sometimes push boundaries but consistently succeed in flavor and execution. The simple menu of small plates (order two to three per person) is influenced by Asian flavors and uses European cooking techniques, combining unusual ingredients that offer pleasing contrasts in flavor and texture." The restaurant earned Sarah Pliner a James Beard Foundation Award nomination in the Best Chef: Northwest category.

Michael Russell included the restaurant in The Oregonian's 2017 list of the 40 best restaurants in northeast Portland and 2018 list of the city's 40 best restaurants. In 2018, he recommended Aviary "[b]ecause from the shrimp toast with lemon anchovy aioli to the hoisin-glazed beef short rib with turnip cake, the menu at Sarah Pliner's creative Northeast Portland restaurant looks as intriguing as it is indulgent".

See also 

 List of defunct restaurants of the United States
 List of French restaurants
 List of New American restaurants

References 

2011 establishments in Oregon
2020 disestablishments in Oregon
Defunct Asian restaurants in Portland, Oregon
Defunct French restaurants in Portland, Oregon
Defunct New American restaurants
New American restaurants in Portland, Oregon
Restaurants disestablished during the COVID-19 pandemic
Restaurants disestablished in 2020
Restaurants established in 2011
Vernon, Portland, Oregon